Aleksandar Josipović (born 15 January 1981) is a French-Serbian former dancer, author, and marketing consultant.

Biography 
Aleksandar Josipović was born on 15 January 1981 in Lazarevac, former Socialist Federal Republic of Yugoslavia, present Serbia. His dancing career began at the age of 9.

He won 9 national championships in ballroom dancing, he was a finalist in the Golden World Cup (England) and a semifinalist in the World Cup (Hungary). He has danced and performed for many royal families, as well as for some countries presidents. He holds both French and Serbian citizenship.

Education and work 

 2000 - 2002. Mathematics Faculty of University of Belgrade
 2005 - 2009. Centre national de la Danse, Paris, France
 2006 - 2007. Postdoctoral studies 'Dance movement therapy', Codarts Academy, Rotterdam, The Netherlands
 2008 - 2009. A diploma in Neuro-linguistic programming, UCSC, United States 

Josipović has worked as a consultant and a marketing manager since 2002. He worked on projects in many fields such as media, fashion, show business, hosting, production, culture and education across France, Serbia, Slovenia, Bosnia and Herzegovina, the Netherlands, Finland, United States, Spain, Latvia, Russia, Italy, Belgium, and Austria.

During the period from 2013-2015, he was appointed as the director of Professional Department and Training Process at National Foundation for Dance and has organized international dancing seminars in Serbia.

Career 
After spending 11 years in a dancing club in Lazarevac, in 2001 Josipović received an invitation to dance in China in the French cabaret show Paris Paradis. During the next year and with the support of a choreographer Clodet Wolker, he soon began to gather information on Moulin Rouge audition. He was accepted in cabaret after a three-hour audition. He performed as a soloist there for a decade. He is the only man from Serbia that has ever played on Moulin Rouge stage.

Josipović performed as master of ceremonies at the second semi-final of Eurovision Song Contest 2008.

He was one of the judges in the Serbian edition of 'Dancing with the Stars'.

Living in Dubai since 2015, Josipović has been a marketing director and consultant.

Books 
Known as the author of works in European lifestyle magazines, he is also an author of four books of which some are under the auspices of UNESCO, such as the first book in Serbia on topic of dancing pedagogy called, basics of dancing '' and ''. He gave all the income from publishing his fourth book ''  for humanitarian cause for people who were imperiled due to floods that have occurred across Serbia and Bosnia in 2014.

References

External links
 Official website

French ballroom dancers
Dancing with the Stars
Motivational writers
Dance writers
Consultants
Eurovision Song Contest people
1981 births
Living people
Serbian emigrants to France
Writers from Belgrade
21st-century French dancers
Serbian dancers